Hadda, also Haddah or Hadah, is a southwestern neighborhood of Sanaʽa, Yemen. It contains landmarks such as the Lebanese International University (Yemen), Hadda Park, Lebanon Heart Hospital, Aljabowbi Castle, the Japanese Embassy, Hadda Mineral Water Factory, Shohada Al Sabeen School and Hadda Valley School. The area to the very west on the absolute limits of Sana'a is known as the Hadda Valley.

References

Sanaa